Chalais may refer to:

 Chalais, Switzerland
 Chalais, Charente, a commune in France
 Chalais, Dordogne, formerly Chaleix, a commune in France
 Chalais, Indre, a commune in France
 Chalais, Vienne, a commune in France
 Monastère de Chalais, a convent in the Isère department of France